Gira 100 años contigo is the sixth concert tour by American group Ha*Ash. in support of their fifth studio album 30 de Febrero (2017). The tour began in Viña del Mar, Chile on February 24, 2018, and concluded in Mexico City, Mexico on February 14. 2020. A live recording was released on 6 December 2019 under the title Ha*Ash: En Vivo.

Background and development 
Following the release of 30 de Febrero (2017). Ha*Ash announced they would embark on their sixth headlining concert tour, following the 1F Hecho Realidad Tour. The tour was announced by Ha*Ash on her social media in November 2017,  with the tour beginning on February 24, 2018. The tour was continues in the Auditorio Nacional of Mexico City with 3 shows. The tour included South America, North America and Europe.

At some shows, Ha*Ash covered songs such as "Adios Amor" by Christian Nodal. Footage from the concert at the Auditorio Nacional in México were recorded and i will released on a DVD in 2019. The setlist includes songs of the new album but also older singles from Ha*Ash, Mundos Opuestos, Habitación Doble, A Tiempo and Primera fila: Hecho Realidad.

Broadcasts and recordings 

A double disc CD and DVD, titled Ha*Ash: En Vivo was released on December 6, 2019, featuring the performance recorded on November 11, 2018. The show filmed at the Auditorio Nacional in Mexico City, Mexico. The collection featured the full concert, a behind-the-scenes feature, along with an audio CD of the concert.

Opening acts 

 Raquel Sofía – March 14 and 15, 2018 and April 20, 2018.
 Forer – June 1, 2018.
 Bridget González – October 23, 2018.
 Techy Fatule – October 27, 2018.
 Felix y Gil – November 11, 2018.
 Carolina Ross – November 19, 2018.
 Arcano – December 14, 2018.
 Coastcity – February 1 and 2, 2019.
 Chucho Rivas – April 4 and 5, 2019.
 Sergio Vivar – August 24, 2019.

Special guests 

 Prince Royce – February 24, 2018 and November 11, 2018: "100 Años".
 Melendi – June 1, 2018; June 3, 2018 and November 11, 2018: "Destino o Casualidad".
 Miguel Bosé – November 11, 2018: "Si Tu No Vuelves".
 Maria José Loyola – February 1 and 2, 2019: "Rosas en Mi Almohada".
 Soledad Pastorutti – February 12, 2019: "Te Dejo en Libertad".
Jesse & Joy – August 24, 2019: "La de la Mala Suerte".

Set list 
This is the setlist for the show at The Fillmore Miami Beach at Jackie Gleason Theater in Miami Beach, United States on October 21, 2018. It is not representative of every show on the tour.

 Estés Donde Estés (Intro)
 ¿De Dónde Sacas Eso?
 Amor a Medias
 Ojalá
 Sé Que Te Vas
 Todo No Fue Suficiente
 ¿Qué Me Faltó?
 Destino o Casualidad
 Dos Copas de Más
 Eso No Va a Suceder
 ¿Qué Hago Yo?
 No Pasa Nada
 Adiós Amor (Christian Nodal cover)
 Te Dejo en Libertad
 Ex de Verdad
 100 Años
 Lo Aprendí de Ti
 No Te Quiero Nada
Encore
Perdón, Perdón
30 de Febrero

{| class="collapsible collapsed" width="100%" style="background-color:#White; border-radius:10px;"
! style="background-color:#D8BFD8; border:; padding-left:5px; border-radius:7px" |Setlist 1 - Feb/3/2018 - Mar/31/2018
|-
|
Setlist

 Estés Donde Estés (Intro)
 ¿De Dónde Sacas Eso?
 Amor a Medias
 Ojalá
 Sé Que Te Vas
 Todo No Fue Suficiente 
 ¿Qué Me Faltó? 
 Destino o Casualidad 
 Tu y Yo Volvemos al Amor (Mónica Naranjo cover)
 Dos Copas De Más
 Eso No Va a Suceder
 ¿Qué Hago Yo?
 Me Entrego a Ti
 No Pasa Nada
 Te Dejo En Libertad
 Ex De Verdad
 100 Años
 Lo Aprendí De Ti
 Odio Amarte
 No Te Quiero Nada
Encore
 Perdón, Perdón
 30 de Febrero

|}

{| class="collapsible collapsed" width="100%" style="background-color:#White; border-radius:10px;"
! style="background-color:#D8BFD8; border:; padding-left:5px; border-radius:7px" |Setlist 2 - Apr/3/2018 - Nov/23/2018
|-
|
Setlist

 Estés Donde Estés (Intro)
 ¿De Dónde Sacas Eso?
 Amor a Medias
 Ojalá
 Sé Que Te Vas
 Todo No Fue Suficiente
 ¿Qué Me Faltó?
 Destino o Casualidad
 Dos Copas De Más
 Eso No Va a Suceder
 ¿Qué Hago Yo?
 Me Entrego a Ti
 No Pasa Nada
 Te Dejo En Libertad
 Ex De Verdad
 100 Años
 Lo Aprendí De Ti
 Odio Amarte
 No Te Quiero Nada
Encore
 Perdón, Perdón
 30 de Febrero

|}

{| class="collapsible collapsed" width="100%" style="background-color:#White; border-radius:10px;"
! style="background-color:#D8BFD8; border:; padding-left:5px; border-radius:7px" |Setlist 3 - Nov/24/2018 - 2019
|-
|
Setlist
 
 Estés Donde Estés (Intro)
 ¿De Dónde Sacas Eso?
 Amor a Medias
 Ojalá
 Sé Que Te Vas
 Todo No Fue Suficiente
 ¿Qué me faltó?
 Destino o Casualidad
 Dos Copas De Más
 Eso No Va a Suceder
 ¿Qué Hago Yo?
 No Pasa Nada
 Adiós Amor (Christian Nodal cover) (in North America)
 Te Dejo En Libertad
 Ex De Verdad
 100 Años
 Lo Aprendí De Ti
 Odio Amarte (in México)
 No Te Quiero Nada
Encore
 Perdón, Perdón
 30 de Febrero

|}

Tour dates

Notes

References

External links 

 Official site.

Ha*Ash concert tours
2018 concert tours
2019 concert tours
2020 concert tours
Concert tours of South America
Concert tours of Europe
Concert tours of North America